Elisabeth Moore won the singles tennis title of the 1905 U.S. Women's National Singles Championship by defeating Helen Homans 6–4, 5–7, 6–1 in the final of the All Comers' tournament. May Sutton was the reigning champion but did not defend her title in the Challenge Round. The event was played on outdoor grass courts and held at the Philadelphia Cricket Club in Wissahickon Heights, Chestnut Hill, Philadelphia from June 20 through June 24, 1905.

Draw

All Comers' finals

References

1905
1905 in women's tennis
June 1905 sports events
1905 in American women's sports
Women's Singles
Chestnut Hill, Philadelphia
1900s in Philadelphia
1905 in sports in Pennsylvania
Women's sports in Pennsylvania